Vatheia (also Vathia) is a village on the Mani Peninsula, in south-eastern Laconia. The local community of Vatheia is named after this village. The aforementioned local community is a subdivision of the municipal unit of Oitylo. It is known for its tower-houses built on a hill dominating the surrounding countryside. Vatheia is linked by road north to Areopoli and Kalamata and south to Cape Matapan also known as Tenaro. In the northern and eastern direction, the southern reaches of the Sangias mountain range overlook the village. Farmland and maquis shrubland cover the hill slopes. On the hills and mountain sides around Vatheia proper are clusters of abandoned houses, towers and chapels known as the perichora, meaning environs. Currently, Vatheia is a tourist attraction during spring and summer due to the abundance of wild flowers that cover the nearby hills and its scenic views. Moreover, it is an iconic example of the south Maniot vernacular architecture as it developed during the 18th and 19th centuries.  The nearest villages are Kyparissos, Alika and Gerolimenas to the north-west and Lagia to the north-east.

History 

Vathia is first mentioned in 1571, by a Venetian diplomatic mission, as "casale di Vathia". In 1618, an unofficial census was conducted by an agent of Charles, Duke of Nevers named Philipe de Lange Châteaurenault in cooperation with a prominent Maniot clan leader named Pietro Medici. The village was recorded as "vatia" with 20 hearths. In 1700, the Grimani census was carried out for the newly established Kingdom of the Morea. The Venetians recorded a total population of 212 persons distributed in 54 families. The reasons for this substantial population growth over the 17th century are unclear.

On 13 April 1805, William Martin Leake by-passed Vatheia ("Βάθια" in text) on the way to Cape Matapan, using the sea-side road, but his journey was briefly interrupted by a band of local armed men. His guides, being Maniots themselves, negotiated passage and informed him that Vatheia has been divided in two warring parties for the past 40 years. They estimated that about 100 men had been killed since the beginning of this clan war. Leake also informs us that Vatheia and its environs consist of three adjacent villages. Between 1750 and 1900 the main nuclei of habitation, apart from the village itself, were several hamlets spread over the whole region controlled by the Vathia clans and their allies. Of the eight clans, in total, the four larger were living in Vatheia proper and its environs (Karabatiani, Michalakiani, Kaledoniani, Koutrigari) while the rest were mostly restricted in some of the aforementioned hamlets.

Below follows a list of the clans with their constituent families:

On 15 August 1806, representatives of many prominent Maniot clans gathered in Marathonisi to sign an oath of fealty to Andonis Grigorakis, Bey of Mani. The entry for Vatheia was as follows: "Michalakiani, Gerandoniani and Karabatiani and the environs, we abide collectively". The communal decision to swear fealty to the Bey might have signalled the end of the war mentioned by Leake a year earlier. Furthermore, this is the only known mention of the Gerandoniani clan. The local clan war that started in 1764 was the catalyst in the formation of the clans which dominated the region from the 19th century until its, nearly total, abandonment during the post-World War II years.

In several places around the modern village as well as in other locations within the periphery of the local community, earlier habitation is evident by the megalithic remains of housing clusters. The closest to modern Vatheia are the Palaiochora built along a stream below the modern village, the Kostakianika Kalyvia built on the hillside a short distance to the north-west and Pachia a similar hamlet on the mountainside just opposite the hill of modern Vatheia. They belong to the category of megalithic structures named after the large, roughly-hewn blocks of stone used by the builders. This is a term used throughout Mani to describe the older abandoned settlements sharing the aforementioned characteristic construction.

Historical population

See also
 List of settlements in Laconia

References

Populated places in Laconia
Populated places in the Mani Peninsula
East Mani